Frederick Joseph Tauby (born Fred Joseph Taubensee from March 27, 1906 – November 23, 1955), was a Major League Baseball outfielder who played in  and  with the Chicago White Sox and the Philadelphia Phillies. He batted and threw right-handed. Tauby had a .077 career batting average, with four hits in 54 at-bats.

Tauby was born in Canton, Ohio and died in Concord, CA.

External links

1906 births
1955 deaths
Chicago White Sox players
Philadelphia Phillies players
Baseball players from Ohio
Major League Baseball outfielders
Terre Haute Tots players
Durham Bulls players
Evansville Hubs players
Beaumont Exporters players
San Antonio Missions players
Fort Worth Cats players
Dallas Steers players
Little Rock Travelers players
Baltimore Orioles (IL) players
Birmingham Barons players
Oakland Oaks (baseball) players